Survivor 42 is the forty-second season of the American competition television series Survivor. The season premiered on March 9, 2022, on CBS in the United States and Global in Canada.  It ended on May 25, 2022, when Maryanne Oketch was voted the Sole Survivor, defeating Michael "Mike" Turner and Romeo Escobar in a 7–1–0 vote.  With her victory, Oketch became the second Canadian castaway to win the game after Erika Casupanan from Survivor 41, the fifth castaway of African descent to win after Vecepia Towery from Survivor: Marquesas, Earl Cole from Survivor: Fiji, Jeremy Collins from Survivor: Cambodia, and Wendell Holland from Survivor: Ghost Island, and the second black female castaway to win after Towery.

Both the 41st and 42nd season of Survivor were originally ordered in May 2020. Production and broadcast of the season were impacted by the COVID-19 pandemic. Filming occurred in Fiji for the tenth consecutive season during May and June 2021.

Production

Development 

Much like the previous season, it is a shortened season spanning only 26 out of the usual 39 days, due to the COVID-19 pandemic requiring all cast and production members to quarantine for 14 days and taking up some of the short production time.

Gameplay 
This season reused several twists introduced in the previous season. Returning twists included the "Shot In the Dark," the "Beware Advantage," and various decision games which forced players to make game-altering choices. New to this season was the "Advantage Amulet" which was initially shared by three players at the start of the game; the fewer of its owners remained in the game, the more power it gained.

Contestants
The cast was announced on February 9, 2022, and consisted of 18 new players divided into three tribes: Ika, Taku, and Vati. The tribe names, in Fijian, come from various species of "fish," "hawksbill sea turtle," and "swimming crab," respectively. The merged tribe name Kula Kula comes from the Fijian word "Kula" meaning collared lory, the national bird of Fiji.

Season summary

Episodes

Voting history

Notes

Reception

Critical reception
Survivor 42 received mainly positive reviews with praise directed towards the cast, editing, and the eventual winner. However, the season received some criticism for repeating many of the twists and challenges from Survivor 41. Dalton Ross of Entertainment Weekly ranked this season 20th out of 42. He stated that "the entire season often felt like a rerun" due to the repetition of the format used in the previous season. However, he praised the producers and editing direction for having more focus on the players rather than the twists and called Maryanne's victory the best story of the season. Jake Cole of Slant Magazine ranked the season 8th out of 42, praising the cast, editing, gameplay, and the winner's "masterclass" Final Tribal Council performance. Gordon Holmes of Xfinity said that "For better or for worse, seasons 41 and 42 are going to be linked together forever. They're basically an identical format with different casts. And 41 was fine while 42 was great." Andy Dehnart of reality blurred called Survivor 42 an improvement over the previous season due to "a clearer, stronger story arc that spans at least half the season, if not more."

Viewing figures

United States

References

External links 
 

42
2022 American television seasons
Television productions postponed due to the COVID-19 pandemic
2021 in Fiji
Television shows filmed in Fiji
Television shows set in Fiji